Maria Hilda Rodriguez Rodriguez (born May 10, 1955, in Lugo) is a boccia player from Spain.  She has a physical disability: She has cerebral palsy and is a BC2 type athlete.  She competed at the 1996 Summer Paralympics.  She finished first in the BC1/BC2 team event.  She finished first in the BC2 one person event.

References 

Spanish boccia players
Living people
1955 births
Paralympic gold medalists for Spain
Boccia players at the 1996 Summer Paralympics
Sportspeople from Lugo
Paralympic boccia players of Spain
Paralympic medalists in boccia
Medalists at the 1996 Summer Paralympics